Trautmannsdorf may refer to:

Places
Trautmannsdorf in Oststeiermark, Austria
Trautmannsdorf an der Leitha, Austria
Trautmannsdorf, part of Geras, Austria

People
Trauttmansdorff (family), Austrian-Bohemian noble family (1635 counts, 1805 princes)
Adam von Trautmannsdorf
Ferdinand von Trauttmansdorff
Maximilian von und zu Trauttmansdorff

See also
Trauttmansdorff Castle in Tyrol, northern Italy
Trauttmansdorff Castle Gardens